All-Star Weekend is an unreleased American sports comedy-drama film directed by Jamie Foxx, who co-wrote the screenplay with Donald "Speedy" Caldwell Jr. Produced by Foxx, Avram "Butch" Kaplan, Chuck Pacheco, and Deon Taylor, the film stars Foxx, Jeremy Piven, Jessica Szohr, Eva Longoria, Robert Downey Jr., Ken Jeong, Gerard Butler, and Benicio del Toro.

By August 2022, the film was considered indefinitely shelved.

Premise
Malik and Danny, two truck drivers who are basketball fanatics, worship their respective favorite players, LeBron James and Stephen Curry. Danny's girlfriend Abby is reconsidering the relationship because she does not want to take a back seat to his obsession. The two drivers finally get a break from their dead-end job when they win tickets to the NBA All-Star Game. On their way to the big game, Malik and Danny meet the beautiful and mysterious Asia, who might have her own hidden agenda. After many twists and turns, the guys find themselves and their heroes in a precarious life-or-death situation.

Cast

Production

Casting 
In October 2012, the film was first announced as part of an informal partnership between Jamie Foxx and Ken Jeong, where they agreed to star in movies written by the other. Due to the partnership, Jeong signed on to All-Star Weekend, while Foxx would have starred in Jeong's After Prom, but production on that film ended up in development hell. In early 2016, Robert Downey Jr., Gerard Butler, Benicio del Toro, Jessica Szohr, and Eva Longoria were confirmed to star in the film alongside Foxx and Jeong.

Filming 
Principal photography began on October 26, 2016, in Los Angeles, California, with John T. Connor serving as cinematographer. Several actors were confirmed to appear including Jeremy Piven, DJ Khaled, French Montana, Inanna Sarkis, Jasmine Waltz, Luenell, Terrence Terrell, Corinne Foxx, Tyrin Turner, The Game, and RD Whittington. During a July 2017 podcast interview on The Joe Rogan Experience, Jamie Foxx revealed that he "will portray a white, racist cop" and "managed to convince Robert Downey Jr. to play a Mexican" in the film. Foxx reiterated this during a June 2018 interview on Jimmy Kimmel Live!, while also revealing that Downey Jr. was only on set for four hours. In January 2019, the film was in post-production. Jeffery Alan Jones served as re-recording mixer, via Alan Audio Works.

Release 

All-Star Weekend was originally scheduled to be released on February 16, 2018, to coincide with the 2018 NBA All-Star Game, but post-production was not completed in time. The film was delayed to February 22, 2019, within the week of the 2019 NBA All-Star Game, but ended up missing the release date for undisclosed reasons. The film was then projected to be released sometime later in 2019, then later projected to be released in 2021. By July 2022, the film was considered indefinitely shelved. In August 2022, Jamie Foxx confirmed the film will not be released, due to it "trying to break open the sensitive corners with Robert Downey Jr. playing a Mexican man". Downey Jr.'s role was stated to have been inspired by his character Kirk Lazarus in Tropic Thunder (2008).

References

External links 
 

American basketball films
American independent films
American satirical films
American sports comedy-drama films
Films shot in Los Angeles
Unreleased American films